The Zinkiv Regiment was one of the territorial-administrative subdivisions of the Cossack Hetmanate. The regiment's capital was the city of Zinkiv, now in Poltava Oblast of central Ukraine.

The Zinkiv Regiment was founded in 1661 on the territories of the disbanded Hadiach county out of the Poltava Regiment.

In 1671, the regiment was renamed Hadiach Regiment.

Structure
The regiment comprised 12 sotnias:
Birky
Hadiach
Hrun'
Komyshnia
Kotelva
Kovalivka
Kuzemyn
Lutenka
Opishnia
Rashivka
Vepryk
Zinkivsk

References

Cossack Hetmanate Regiments
History of Poltava Oblast
1661 establishments in the Polish–Lithuanian Commonwealth